Polewali Mandar is one of the five regencies in West Sulawesi province of Indonesia.  It borders on the regencies of Mamasa in the North, Majene in the West and Pinrang regency of South Sulawesi in the East.  It covers an area of 2,074.76 km2 and had a population of 396,120 at the 2010 Census and 478,534 at the 2020 Census. The official estimate as at mid 2021 was 483,920. The regency is inhabited by several ethnic groups such as Mandar, Buginese, Javanese and Toraja.

Mandar is an indigenous ethnic group forming the majority of the population. There are several national public figures originated from this region. The most famous one is the legendary Attorney General Baharuddin Lopa. The current provincial governor, Ali Baal Masdar, is the former regent of the region.

This regency is considered quite fertile with large enough paddy farm as well as plantation for chocolate and coconut plants. The regency covers both coast-line and mountain areas.

Polewali Mandar is also known as the origin of prau sandeq, a  boat propelled especially by sails or paddles.

History 
Polewali Mandar Regency used to be part of Polewali Mamasa Regency, a former Indonesian Regency that used to be part of South Sulawesi but later became part of West Sulawesi province. In 2002, the regency was split into two smaller regencies: Polewali Mandar Regency which is located on the sea-side region, and Mamasa Regency on the mountain area. Polewali Mandar is mainly inhabited by the Mandar ethnic group, while Mamasa is home to the Mamasa people, who are related to the ethnic group Mamasa.

Administration 
The regency is divided into sixteen districts (kecamatan), tabulated below with their areas and their populations at the 2010 Census and the 2020 Census, together with the official estimates as at mid 2021. The table also includes the locations of the district administrative centres, the numbers of villages (rural desa and urban kelurahan) in each district, and its post code.

Notes: (a) including 8 offshore islands. (b) except the village of Mammi (with a post code of 91311) and the villages of Kuajang and Paku (with a post code of 91351).

See also
Polewali-Mamasa

References 

Regencies of West Sulawesi